Petrona Mejía Chutá (born 4 October 1973) is a Guatemalan politician and indigenous human rights activist, from National Unity of Hope party. She has been a member of Congress since January 2020 and chair of the Indigenous Peoples Commission of Congress.

References 

1973 births
Living people
21st-century Guatemalan women politicians
21st-century Guatemalan politicians
Guatemalan women activists
Guatemalan Maya people
Guatemalan indigenous rights activists
Women human rights activists
People from Chimaltenango Department
Members of the Congress of Guatemala
National Unity of Hope politicians